Tetsumi Nabeya (born 2 January 1930) is a Japanese gymnast. He competed in eight events at the 1952 Summer Olympics.

References

1930 births
Living people
Japanese male artistic gymnasts
Olympic gymnasts of Japan
Gymnasts at the 1952 Summer Olympics
Place of birth missing (living people)